The 1931 Santa Barbara State Roadrunners football team represented Santa Barbara State during the 1931 college football season.

Santa Barbara State competed in the Southern California Conference (SCC). The Roadrunners were led by fourth-year head coach Harold Davis and played home games at Peabody Stadium in Santa Barbara, California. They finished the season with a record of one win, five losses and one tie (1–5–1, 0–5 SCC). Overall, the team was outscored by its opponents 46–115 for the season.

Schedule

Notes

References

Santa Barbara State
UC Santa Barbara Gauchos football seasons
Santa Barbara State Roadrunners football